Matthias von Schoenberg (9 November 1732 – 20 April 1792 in Munich) was a Catholic author.

References

1732 births
1792 deaths
Writers from Munich
German Roman Catholics
German male writers